The Indian Naval Air Squadron 313 (INAS 313) is a maritime reconnaissance squadron of the Indian Navy based at Chennai. The squadron was commissioned on 22 July 2019 and operates the Dornier 228 twin-turboprop aircraft under the Eastern Naval Command of the Navy.

History 
The squadron was officially commissioned on 22 July 2020 by the Navy Chief, Admiral Karambir Singh. The squadron's commissioning CO(Commanding Officer) is Cdr Vivek Koman, an experienced aviator. The unit is situated in the Naval Air Enclave, Chennai and is controlled by the Eastern Naval Command. It is Tamil Nadu's third air base and the fifth Dornier 228 fixed wing aircraft based squadron of the Indian Navy.

The squadron has been primarily tasked with maritime surveillance, search and rescue operations and to provide targeting data for weapon platforms. It is expected to increase the Navy's surveillance capabilities along the 1,400 km Eastern coast of India. Originally raised with just two Dornier 228s, the Navy plans on inducting 12 new such aircraft while upgrading 18 of the older ones to specifications that include glass cockpit, advanced surveillance radar, ELINT capability and networking features.

See also 
List of Indian naval air squadrons
INAS 318
INAS 311
INAS 310

References 

Aircraft squadrons of the Indian Navy
Naval units and formations of India
Military units and formations established in 2019